The 2015 Ho Chi Minh City International Women Football Tournament is an invitational women's football tournament hosted in Ho Chi Minh City, Vietnam. This will be the first time that Vietnam will host an international women's football tournament.

Ho Chi Minh City F.C. won the round-robin tournament, Myanmar U-21 finished second place, Hong Kong settled for third place and the FEU Lady Tamaraws of Philippine-based Far Eastern University finished last.

Venue

Results

Schedule retrieved from the Hong Kong Football Association

Awards

References

2015 in women's association football
2015 in Vietnamese football